Michael Karst (born 28 January 1952 in Mannheim) is a retired 3000 m steeplechaser from West Germany.

Biography
He finished fifth at the 1976 Summer Olympics, first at the 1977 World Cup and fourth at the 1978 European Championships. He also won two silver and one gold medal at the Summer Universiades in 1973, 1975 and 1977. At the 1977 European Indoor Championships he finished sixth in 3000 metres.

In June 1974 he set a new European record of 8:18.4 minutes, which he improved to a then-national record of 8:18.0 at the 1974 European Championships where he won the bronze medal. He improved his (West) German record on two occasions in Stockholm, first to 8:16.2 minutes in July 1975 and finally to 8:14.05 minutes in July 1977. This result places him sixth on the German all-time performers list, behind Damian Kallabis, Hagen Melzer, Frank Baumgartl, Rainer Schwarz and Uwe Pflügner.

Karst won five German national titles, in the years 1974-1977 and 1979. He competed for the sports clubs SV Saar 05 Saarbrücken and USC Mainz during his active career.

References

External links
 
 
 

1952 births
Living people
West German male steeplechase runners
West German male long-distance runners
Sportspeople from Mannheim
Athletes (track and field) at the 1976 Summer Olympics
Olympic athletes of West Germany
European Athletics Championships medalists
German male steeplechase runners
Universiade medalists in athletics (track and field)
Universiade gold medalists for West Germany
Universiade silver medalists for West Germany
Medalists at the 1973 Summer Universiade
Medalists at the 1975 Summer Universiade
Medalists at the 1977 Summer Universiade